Irakli Chkhikvadze (born 5 October 1987 in Kutaisi, Georgia) is a Georgian rugby union and former professional rugby league footballer currently playing for RC AIA Kutaisi in the Georgia Championship competition.

Chkhikvadze is also an international player for the Georgia national team, making his debut in a match against Chile in 2005, at the age of 18.

External links
IRB.com profile

1987 births
Rugby union players from Georgia (country)
Russia national rugby league team players
Living people
Georgia international rugby union players
Rugby union wings